is a railway station on the Banetsu West Line in the city of Kōriyama, Fukushima, Japan, operated by East Japan Railway Company (JR East).

Lines

Station layout
Bandai-Atami Station has two opposed side platforms connected to the station building by a footbridge. The station has a "Midori no Madoguchi" staffed ticket office.

Platforms

History
It was renamed  on March 20, 1925, and renamed Bandai-Atami on June 1, 1965. The station was absorbed into the JR East network upon the privatization of the Japanese National Railways (JNR) on April 1, 1987.

Passenger statistics
In fiscal 2016, the station was used by an average of 262 passengers daily (boarding passengers only).

Surrounding area

Atami Post Office

See also
 List of Railway Stations in Japan

References

External links

 

Stations of East Japan Railway Company
Railway stations in Fukushima Prefecture
Ban'etsu West Line
Railway stations in Japan opened in 1898
Kōriyama